Jiedong District, formerly Jiedong County, is a district of eastern Guangdong province, China. It is under the administration of Jieyang City.

County-level divisions of Guangdong
Jieyang